The 1988 Boston University Terriers football team was an American football team that represented Boston University as a member of the Yankee Conference during the 1988 NCAA Division I-AA football season. In their first season under head coach Chris Palmer, the Terriers compiled a 4–7 record (3–5 against conference opponents), finished in a tie for seventh place in the Yankee Conference, and were outscored by a total of 285 to 230.

Schedule

References

Boston University
Boston University Terriers football seasons
Boston University Terriers football